The following are notable Australian Presbyterians:

Arthur Aspinall – co-founder and first principal of The Scots College, Bellevue Hill, Sydney; Congregational and Presbyterian minister; Joint founder of the Historical Society of New South Wales
Jessie Aspinall – first female junior medical resident at the Royal Prince Alfred Hospital
Peter Cameron – principal of St Andrew's College; Minister convicted by the Presbyterian Church of Australia of heresy
Arthur Dean (judge)
John Ferguson – Presbyterian minister; acting principal of St Andrew's Theological College; senior chaplain and chairman of the Presbyterian Ladies' College, Sydney Council 
John Flynn – founder of the Royal Flying Doctor Service of Australia and the Australian Inland Mission
James Forbes – minister of the Free Presbyterian Church of Victoria and founder of the Melbourne Academy, a college for boys (later Scotch College).
Friedrich Hagenauer – Presbyterian minister; founder of Ramahyuck Mission to house the members of the Ganai tribe who survived attacks in west and central Gippsland
Allan Harman – principal of the Presbyterian Theological College
Rev. Dr Andrew Harper – Biblical scholar and teacher
Matthew Guy – Victorian Leader of the Opposition
Adrian Kebbe – former weightlifter
John Dunmore Lang (1799–1878) – Presbyterian minister, writer, politician and activist
Dr. John Marden – first Headmaster of the Presbyterian Ladies' College, Sydney; Pioneer of women's education; Presbyterian elder
John McGarvie – Presbyterian minister and writer
William McIntyre – first Gaelic-speaking minister in Australia; educator
Dr Ewen Neil McQueen – second headmaster of the Presbyterian Ladies' College, Sydney; Prominent educational innovator; Scientist; Psychologist; General Practitioner 
Sir Robert Menzies – Australian prime minister
Reverend William Miller – minister of the Free Presbyterian Church of Victoria 
David Charles Mitchell - lawyer, minister and solicitor-general of Lesotho.
Sibyl Enid Vera Munro Morrison – first female barrister in New South Wales
William Ridley – English Presbyterian missionary who studied Australian Aboriginal languages
Robert Steel – 19th-century Scottish/Australian minister and religious author
Joan Sutherland – operatic soprano (Australian by birth; parents were of Scottish Presbyterian descent)
Reverend F. R. M. Wilson – early pioneer lichenologist and minister
Bruce W. Winter – principal of Queensland Theological College

See also
Presbyterian Church of Australia

References

External links
Official website of the Presbyterian Church of Australia
The Presbyterian Church of Australia in New South Wales
The Presbyterian Church of Queensland
The Presbyterian Church of Victoria

Presbyterianism in Australia
 
Presbyterians
Australian
Presbyterians